Jordan Plevnes (born 1953) is a Macedonian writer and diplomat. From 2000 to 2005 he served as Ambassador of the Republic of Macedonia to France, Spain and Portugal. Since 2006 he has served as vice president of UNESCO's international committee for dialogue between civilizations.

He is the founder of the World Prized of Humanism and the Ohrid Academy of Humanism in Macedonia on 19.01.1991 with Liljana Kotevska Plevnes, Zoran Veljanovski Letra and several Macedonian intellectuals. In 2018 he co-founded with Frederic Fappani von Lothringen the youth prize for this same prize.

Books about
 World Encyclopedia of Contemporary Theatre: Volume 1: Europe

Books of
 Mazedonische zustände 1997
 La huitième merveille du monde: roman 2006

References

http://www.jordanplevnes.net/biography.html

1953 births
Living people
Macedonian writers
Macedonian diplomats
Ambassadors of North Macedonia to Spain
Ambassadors of North Macedonia to Portugal
Ambassadors of North Macedonia to France